RiffWorks is a guitar recording and online song collaboration program for Mac OS and Windows. RiffWorks is designed and developed by Sonoma Wire Works. The program includes guitar effects, drum tracks, an online music collaboration system, and the ability to post songs to its online community, RiffWorld.com.

History
In 2004, RiffWorks was released to be compatible with Line 6 GuitarPort, PODxt and TonePort ASIO devices. In 2006, RiffWorks was updated to work with all ASIO and CoreAudio devices. In 2008, RiffWorks T4, a free edition, was released as a download from Sonomawireworks.com and is bundled in several Line 6 and IK Multimedia products.

Features
RiffWorks recording software includes loop recording, automatic track creation (24 tracks), 7 guitar-oriented effects and support for amp modeling software.

RiffWorks Standard includes four drum options, InstantDrummer, created from studio drum kit recordings (with more content available from Sonoma Wire Work's website.) RiffWork's Metronome, a user adjustable metronome. RiffWorks' REX Player, an audio loop player (which is not available in the free version.) RiffWorks also supports ReWire.

References

Propellerheads' ReWire Definition and List of Compatible Applications, Retrieved 2011-02-01
RiffWorks Makes You a Better Guitar Player by GuitarVibe.com
Music Player Live Reviewed; RiffWorks Software Perfect for Writing Songs by Create Digital Music
Music Tech Magazine Issue 45 review of RiffWorks Standard 2 by Mike Miller
Sonoma Wire Works RiffWorks Standard v2, Computer Music Magazine, October 2006
RiffWorks: Real-Time Loop-Based Online Music Collaboration by Wired.com
Make your own kind of music on these Web sites by Eric Gwinn of The Chicago Tribune

External links
Sonoma Wire Works
RiffWorks T4 Free Guitar Recording & Online Collaboration Software

Guitar-related software